PC Play & Learn: Learning Fun with Dan and Whizzo (commonly abbreviated to PC Play & Learn) was a series of British Educational software produced by International Masters Publishers in association with act-two, and released throughout the early to mid-2000s, delivered as part of a subscription. In these games, you would play with four dinosaurs, Dan, his older sister, Pink's friend Delilah, and Dan's pet, Whizzo. The series would come in separate CD-ROM discs in the subscription, along with a booklet and a mini binder. The series was relatively obscure until popular YouTube user tamago2474 featured it in a video for April Fool's Day in 2018, prompting a renewed interest in the series.

Gameplay
In the games, you would play with the dinosaur characters in the Play Zone (later the Tree House), learning basic skills like Counting, Music, Letters, and more. Along the way you would collect dinosaur egg pieces, and collecting four would grant access to a special Dinosaurs for that disc (e.g. Sportysaurus in "Let's Make Friends"). Each disc would have a different theme, like "Under the Sea".

Characters

Main
Dan  A green dinosaur, also one of the main characters of the series. He was three until "Birthday Surprise!" when he was four.
Pink  A pink dinosaur, and Dan's big sister. She can be a bit bossy and annoying. 
Delilah  An orange dinosaur, and Dan and Pink's friend. She is much taller than them.
 Whizzo  A pinkish-red pterodactyl-like bird, he is Dan's pet. He spends most of the time flying around. He doesn’t speak, he squawks.

Friends
Dippy
Sissy
Henry
Troy
Maisie
Lisa 
benny
Tiny Dino   Delilah’s pet, who is very good at jumping. and even won 1st place for it in a pet show. mentioned in perfect pets.
Monty  A bus driver. His only known physical appearance is in the story featured in the "Wheels Go Round" book.
Baby D  A giant pale green dinosaur, only his feet are visible. He spends most of the time running around. His name was first mentioned in "Under the Sea".

List of titles
Let's Make Friends
Under the Sea
Perfect Pets
Wheels Go Round
Green and Growing
Birthday Surprise
Wild Animals
Outer Space
Going Shopping
At the Beach
Jobs People Do
In the Park
Little Beasts and Bugs
Fun and Games
Bedtime
On the Farm
Up, Up and Away!
Happy Birthday, Pink!
Hot and Sunny
Our Five Senses
Fairground Fun
B-R-R-R! It's Freezing
Let's Pretend
Rain and Shine
Painting Pictures
Birds of a Feather
School Days
A New Baby
Dinosaurs
Museum Adventure
Kings and Queens
Long, Long Ago
Calendars
Sun and Moon

References

Children's educational video games
Video games developed in the United Kingdom